Nat Simon (6 August 1900, in Newburgh, New York – 1979) was an American composer, pianist, bandleader and songwriter. From the 1930s to 1950s his songs were used in over 20 films. Between 1931 and 1940 he also took part in the musical Vaudeville revue Songwriters on Parade, which featured hit songwriters of the day. It was considered one of the last Vaudevillian forays of this type.

Nat's daughter, Sally Simon Meisel, who sang vocals was an integral part of his live performances as heard on this 1945 session from New York Public Radio.  https://www.wnyc.org/story/the-music-of-tin-pan-alley/

Songs
 Poinciana, 1936
 "The Old Lamp-Lighter", 1946
 "The Mama Doll Song", 1954?
 "Sandy's Tune" (from That Bad Eartha), 1954
 "Istanbul (Not Constantinople)", 1930s? 1953?
 "No Can Do" from the Copacabana Revue with Charlie Tobias 1945, recorded by Guy Lombardo, Erwin Halletz, Ray Colignon 1950s

References

1900 births
1979 deaths
Songwriters from New York (state)
20th-century American musicians